Major General Roy Cecil Andersen  (born 12 May 1948 in Johannesburg) is a South African businessman and a retired Reserve general officer in the South African Army from the artillery. He matriculated from Northview High School and graduated from Witwatersrand University.

Military career 
He was commissioned into the Artillery in 1966 at 14 Field Regiment in Bethlehem, Orange Free State where he served under the then Officer Commanding- Cmdt C.L. Viljoen. He commanded the Transvaal Horse Artillery from 1976 to 1979 and participated in Operation Savannah both as regimental Commander and Air Observation Post Officer. He was thereafter appointed as Senior Staff Officer Artillery and subsequently Senior Staff Officer Operations of 7 South African Infantry Division. He was promoted to the rank of Major General in October 2003, as Chief Defence Reserves for the South African National Defence Force.

Civilian career 
He studied at the University of the Witwatersrand, qualifying as a Chartered Accountant (SA) in 1972 and as a Certified Public Accountant in 1975 in Texas.

He served as Executive President of the Johannesburg Stock Exchange from 1992 until 1997. He is currently a Director of Nampak.

Honours and awards

Medals 
He has been awarded the

Proficiency badges

References 

|-

1948 births
South African businesspeople
South African Army generals
South African military personnel of the Border War
University of the Witwatersrand alumni
Living people
20th-century South African businesspeople
21st-century South African businesspeople